Rhabdobacter is a bacterial genus from the family of Spirosomaceae.

References

Further reading 
 

Cytophagia
Bacteria genera
Monotypic bacteria genera